MV Demas Victory was a Dubai-based supply ship which sailed to offshore oil and gas platforms. It capsized 10 nautical miles off the coast of the Qatari capital city of Doha on Tuesday 30 June 2009 at 6:30 a.m. local time. The disaster resulted in over 30 missing of the 35 reported to be on board. Only five were rescued, and six bodies recovered. It was feared that many of the passengers were sleeping in their cabins, and those on deck were rescued.

Last voyage 

On 30 June 2009, the captain put in a request to re-enter Doha Port, and entered the channel of Doha's harbour; however, officials advised that the ship remain at anchor due to the rough conditions. The ship capsized within three minutes around this time following a huge wave and strong wind.

At the time of its sinking, the MV Demas Victory was carrying two caterers, nine crew members, and two dozen employees of the charterer HBK Power Cleaning - twelve from Nepal, eleven from India and one from Bangladesh. Midgulf Offshore Ship Chartering LLC had been operating the ship since January 2005.

See also 
 Maritime disasters
 List of shipwrecks in 2009

References

External links
Keralites among victims of boat capsize off Doha coast - Lists the names of those from India aboard the ship.

Maritime incidents in 2009
2009 in Qatar
Shipwrecks in the Persian Gulf
1979 ships